Dracophyllum acerosum is a species of shrub or small tree endemic to New Zealand's South Island. It was first described by Sven Berggren in 1877 and gets the specific epithet acerosum, meaning needles shaped, for its leaves. A 2017 assessment using the New Zealand Threat Classification System classified it as “Not Threatened,” giving it an estimated population of more than 100,000.

References

Citations 

acerosum
Endemic flora of New Zealand